W (also titled I Want Her Dead and W Is the Mark of Death) is a 1974 American psychological thriller film directed by Richard Quine and starring Twiggy, Dirk Benedict and Michael Witney. It was produced by Mel Ferrer.

Plot
Within 24 hours, three near-fatal accidents have occurred. At the scene of each, the letter "W" is scrawled over the injured person. Katie Lewis (Twiggy) and her husband Ben (Michael Witney) discover that these accidents are in fact the work of a mysterious killer, and that they are the real targets. While trying to avoid death, the couple must struggle to discover the source of these attacks.

Cast
Twiggy as Katie Lewis
Michael Witney as Ben Lewis
Eugene Roche as Charles Jasper
Dirk Benedict as William Caulder
John Vernon as Arnie Felson
Michael Conrad as Lt. Whitfield
Alfred Ryder as Investigator

Filming
W was filmed at San Pedro Harbor and Trancas Beach, California, from April 30 to mid-June 1973.

References

External links

1974 films
1970s psychological thriller films
American psychological thriller films
Films scored by Johnny Mandel
Films directed by Richard Quine
Cinerama Releasing Corporation films
Films with screenplays by Ronald Shusett
1970s English-language films
1970s American films